Winick is a surname. Notable people with the surname include:

Bruce Winick (born 1944), American lawyer and academic
Gary Winick (1961–2011), American film director and producer
Herman Winick (born 1932), American physicist
Judd Winick (born 1970), American writer

See also
Winnick